Britta Steffen (born 16 November 1983) is a German competitive swimmer who specializes in freestyle sprint events.

Biography
In 1999, Steffen won six titles at the European Junior Championships, and won a medal as a member of Germany's relay team in the 4 × 200 metre freestyle at the 2000 Summer Olympics. In 2004, she asked to swim the 4×100 m relay. But after the Olympics, she took one year off swimming and concentrated on her studies, which were not finished.

At the 2006 European Championships in Budapest, Steffen clocked 53.30 in the women's 100 m freestyle event, breaking the world record and upstaging the previous record of 53.42 set by Libby Lenton of Australia. Even though Lenton swam a time of 52.99 on 4 April 2007 during the mixed 400 metre freestyle relay, this time was not recognized by the FINA as world record, because the race is not considered to be a FINA event.

At the same championships, Steffen was part of two world record-breaking relay teams. First, the German 4×100 m women's relay team of Dallmann, Goetz, Steffen and Liebs took the Australian 4×100 m freestyle relay (Mills, Lenton, Thomas and Henry) world record of 3:35.94, clocking a time of 3:35.22. The German women's relay team of Dallman, Samulski, Steffen and Liebs, then swam a time of 7:50.82 to take the previous US 4×200 m freestyle relay (Coughlin, Piper, Vollmer and Sandeno) world record that stood at 7:53.42.

At the 2007 World Championships in Melbourne where she finished third in the 100 metre freestyle event and second in the 4 × 200 metre freestyle relay.

During the 2008 Summer Olympic Games in Beijing, China, Steffen won the 100-meter freestyle, catching world record-holder Libby Trickett of Australia at the last stroke. Steffen touched in 53.12 seconds, bettering her own Olympic record of 53.38 set on the leadoff leg of the 4×100 m freestyle relay.  Steffen then edged out Dara Torres to win the 50-meter freestyle gold with a time of 24.06 seconds, winning by 0.01 seconds.

At the 2009 World Championships in Rome, Steffen clocked 52.07 in the 100 m freestyle event, breaking the world record and upstaging the previous record of 52.22 set by herself four days before. Two days later on 2 August 2009, Steffen won her second title in the 50 m freestyle event, breaking the world record with a time of 23.73 seconds.

Her 100-metre freestyle long course world record was broken by Cate Campbell on 2 July 2016.
Her 50-metre freestyle long course world record was broken by Sarah Sjöström on 29 July 2017.

See also
 List of German records in swimming
 World record progression 50 metres freestyle
 World record progression 100 metres freestyle

References

External links

  
 
 
 
 ABC news item on Steffen's world record
 Deutsche Welle article (English)

1983 births
Living people
Sportspeople from Schwedt
People from Bezirk Frankfurt
German female freestyle swimmers
German female swimmers
Swimmers at the 2000 Summer Olympics
Swimmers at the 2004 Summer Olympics
Swimmers at the 2008 Summer Olympics
Swimmers at the 2012 Summer Olympics
Olympic swimmers of Germany
Olympic gold medalists for Germany
Olympic bronze medalists for Germany
World record setters in swimming
Olympic bronze medalists in swimming
World Aquatics Championships medalists in swimming
Medalists at the FINA World Swimming Championships (25 m)
European Aquatics Championships medalists in swimming
Medalists at the 2008 Summer Olympics
Medalists at the 2000 Summer Olympics
Olympic gold medalists in swimming
Universiade medalists in swimming
Recipients of the Silver Laurel Leaf
Recipients of the Order of Merit of Berlin
Universiade gold medalists for Germany
Medalists at the 2007 Summer Universiade
21st-century German women